The 11 November 2018 Mayotte seismic event is a seismic event of unknown origin that occurred about  off the coast of Mayotte, an overseas department and region of France in the Indian Ocean. Despite this, no one felt it. The seismic waves lasted for over 20 minutes. Most earthquakes have P waves and S waves, which are later followed by long-period surface waves. The Mayotte event lacked P waves and S waves, but did cause a long-period surface wave travelling at  around the globe. Additionally, the signal released by the earthquake resembled a clean "zigzag," while most earthquake waves have multiple frequencies.

Cause 
The cause of the event was initially unknown, but scientists from the French Geological Survey believe it may have been caused by an underwater volcano, and also related to an earthquake swarm nearby. The island of Mayotte had experienced hundreds of tremors since May 2018, including a magnitude 5.8 earthquake on 15 May. The quakes had been tapering off until the event occurred.

Another possible explanation that was suggested was that magma from a volcanic chamber approximately  miles underneath the seafloor near Mayotte had suddenly drained, which could have led to the collapse of the roof of the chamber, causing the vibrations.

In May 2019, a recently formed 800 meter high undersea volcano was found in the area of the event. This volcano is now assumed to have been the cause of the tremors.

References 

 

2018 earthquakes
November 2018 events in France